Nattaya Boochatham (Thai:นาตยา บูชาธรรม, born 3 December 1986) is a Thai cricketer who plays for the Thailand women's national cricket team as an all-rounder.

Boochatham was a member of the Thailand team in the 2017 Women's Cricket World Cup Qualifier in February 2017. She was the highest run-scorer for Thailand in the tournament, with 116 runs.

In June 2018, she was named in Thailand's squad for the 2018 ICC Women's World Twenty20 Qualifier tournament. She made her Women's Twenty20 International (WT20I) debut for Thailand on 3 June 2018, in the 2018 Women's Twenty20 Asia Cup. She was the leading run-scorer for Thailand in the tournament, with 86 runs in five matches. She was also the joint-leading wicket-taker for Thailand in the tournament, with six dismissals in five matches.

In November 2018, she was named in the Women's Global Development Squad, to play fixtures against Women's Big Bash League (WBBL) clubs.

In August 2019, she finished the 2019 Netherlands Women's Quadrangular Series as the joint-leading wicket-taker, with nine dismissals from six matches. Later the same month, she was named in Thailand's squad for the 2019 ICC Women's World Twenty20 Qualifier tournament in Scotland. She took more WT20I wickets than any other player in 2019; a total of 40 at an average of 6.17 and an economy rate of 3.23.

In January 2020, Boochatham was named in Thailand's squad for the 2020 ICC Women's T20 World Cup in Australia. In Thailand's last match of the tournament, against Pakistan, she scored 44, and shared in an opening partnership of 93 with Natthakan Chantam.

In November 2021, she was named in Thailand's team for the 2021 Women's Cricket World Cup Qualifier tournament in Zimbabwe. She played in Thailand's first match of the tournament, on 21 November 2021 against Zimbabwe.

In October 2022, she played for Thailand in Women's Twenty20 Asia Cup.

References

Further reading

External links

 

1986 births
Living people
Nattaya Boochatham
Nattaya Boochatham
Nattaya Boochatham
Nattaya Boochatham
Cricketers at the 2010 Asian Games
Cricketers at the 2014 Asian Games
Nattaya Boochatham
Southeast Asian Games medalists in cricket
Competitors at the 2017 Southeast Asian Games
Nattaya Boochatham